Cryptosphaeria is a genus of fungi in the family Diatrypaceae. The genus has a widespread distribution in temperate regions, and contains eight species.

References

Xylariales
Taxa named by Giuseppe De Notaris